Robin Hood and the Prince of Aragon is Child ballad 129.  The song portrays Robin Hood in a tale of chivalrous adventures, such as are uncommon in his ballads, and has seldom been featured in later tales.

Synopsis
Robin Hood, Will Scadlock and Little John hunt a deer. After they feast, Robin meets a black-dressed woman on a black horse. She tells them that the Prince of Aragon has besieged London to demand the princess for his wife. He will only give it up if champions defeat the prince himself and two giants, and has set a deadline of Midsummer. Robin Hood, Will Scadlock, and Little John arrive just in time; Robin defeats the prince, and his men the giants.

Robin begs, and gets, a pardon for himself and his men. The princess chooses to marry Will.  A noble weeps on seeing him, because he had a son much like him, now dead, and Will says that he is that son, still alive. They celebrate the wedding.

References

External links
Robin Hood and the Prince of Aragon

Child Ballads
Robin Hood ballads
Fictional princes
Aragonese infantes
Aragon in fiction